The Hutcheson Nunataks are a small group of nunataks along the north side of Balchen Glacier, about midway between the Phillips Mountains and Abele Nunatak, in Marie Byrd Land, Antarctica. They were discovered and mapped by the United States Antarctic Service, 1939–41, and were named by the Advisory Committee on Antarctic Names for Guy Hutcheson, a radio engineer with the Byrd Antarctic Expedition 1933–35.

References

Nunataks of Marie Byrd Land